The Men's 100 metre backstroke competition of the 2019 African Games was held on 24 August 2019.

Records
Prior to the competition, the existing world and championship records were as follows.

The following new records were set during this competition.

Results

Heats
The heats were started on 24 August at 11:10.

Final

The final was started on 24 August at 17:00.

References

Men's 100 metre backstroke